The Eurasian beaver is the target of several species reintroduction programs in Europe. Historically, beavers have been trapped and hunted for their meat, fur and castoreum, to the point of near extinction.

Disappearance from Europe 
The Eurasian beaver was hunted and trapped to the point of near extinction. Fossil evidence shows that the Eurasian beaver lived from Western Europe to the Chinese-Mongolian border. By the beginning of the 20th century, only about 1,200 Eurasian beavers were left in this area, surviving in eight relict populations in Europe and Asia.

Successful reintroductions 
By 2003, due to reintroduction and protection programs, there were about 639,000 beavers. Successful Eurasian beaver introductions throughout Europe, including England, Scotland, Bavaria, Austria, Netherlands, Serbia, Denmark, and Bulgaria. These successes resulted in Eurasian beavers listed as being of least concern on the (IUCN) red list due to its fast recovery in Europe. Initial reintroduction populations show a time lag between the rate of population growth and the resource growth rates. This is seen in an initial population growth followed by decrease in populations to settle into the amount of resources available to the beaver populations.

Incomplete list of successful reintroductions 
 1922–1939 – Sweden: About 80 beavers were reintroduced to 19 different sites over a 20-year span with an estimated 130,000 individuals present in 2014 
 1923 - USSR: Voronezh Nature Reserve established with the intent of protecting and restoring Beaver populations. From 1934 to 1977, approximately 3,000 Eurasian Beavers from Voronezh were reintroduced to 52 regions of the USSR, from Poland to Mongolia.
 1966–1982 – Bavaria: From extinction, reintroduction has increased to pupation to an estimated 6,000 individuals. As one of the oldest reintroduction sites, it is often visited and studied for the management practices.
 1976–1982 – Austria: Around 40 individuals were introduced in the Danube-Auen National Park downstream of Vienna. They have since then spread to the waters around the Danube inside the city as well. Today (2020), an estimated 230 beavers live in the Vienna region outside the national park proper.
 1988 – Romania: 21 beavers were successfully reintroduced in 1998 along the Olt River, spreading to other rivers in Covasna county 
 1999 – Denmark and Northern Zealand: 18 beavers were released at Klosterheden in West Jutland. Since then, other beavers have been released at Arresø in North Zealand.
 2003 – Spain: 2003, beavers were reintroduced to the Ebro in Spain, with plans for further reintroductions to The Guadalquivir, Guadiana, and Tajo (Tagus) river systems 
 2009–2014 – Scotland: 11 beavers were released in 2009 and four beavers were released in 2014 in the Knapdale forest  and 56 beavers were found at the River Tay, becoming its own study 
 2019 – East Anglia: A pair of beavers was reintroduced to North Essex as part of a pioneering natural flood management scheme for East Anglia

Beaver effects on habitat

Effect on hydrology 
Beavers have been reported to increase water levels, groundwater and surface water storage. Deep canals are created to connect ponds and allow for easy transportation of materials, and can be a significant way of storing groundwater in dry climates. Beavers dam streams less than 10m wide to create “beaver ponds,” which increase open-water and wetland habitat allowing for more aquatic animal species to thrive, nesting space for birds and bats, yet do not influence major rivers or waterways. Sediment storage and energy-dissipation impacts from dams is used as pollutant traps, improving water quality and control flooding. Additionally, deep ponds and canals allow for water storage in areas susceptible to drought. On the other hand, beaver dams help control flooding and sediment degradation from storms, providing environmental support structures that could be costly. Furthermore, increased surface water increases evaporation, contributing to increased fog. Increased surface water, and decreased shade-producing vegetation indicate beavers influence on local temperature regimes, both in the water and air. Some found that damming of feeder streams to main rivers decreased the amount of cold water, and data showed an overall increase in water temperatures after dam creation.

Effect on vegetation 
Changes in plant diversity, height, and abundance was measured, and the results are overall positive. As herbivores, beavers used shrubs and trees with trunk diameters of 3–8 cm to feed on the bark, twigs and leaves. Selective grazing over a 9-year period led to a threefold increase in plant richness in one area studied, a surprise to many researchers. Significant reduction in plant height in both emergent and mat habitats was a drawback, however, studies show that beavers and Aspen (a species of concern for overgrazing) can thrive in the same landscape. Furthermore, the flooding of areas may cause over saturation to the point that some plants or trees die, however this increases coarse woody debris (CWD) found in the areas, attracting wood insects and other species. Certain trees were also reported to have migrated to areas that were drier and a more suitable habitat, thus showing that beavers can help diversify plant species in varying areas. Additionally, ponds and increased waterways have increased growth of both aquatic and non-aquatic plants.

Effect on animal species 
It was found that the presence of beavers increased numbers in aquatic invertebrates, insects, amphibians, birds and bats. Dams create places for insects to lay eggs, such as dragonflies. Coarse woody debris (CWD) from beaver food caches, dams, lodges, and drowned trees increases deadwood insects and provide nesting holes for waterfowl. Observations of otters recolonizing areas that have become more suitable for them following  beaver colonization. Increase in woodland animals like elk and moose have also been observed, including interactions between moose and winter beaver food caches. Furthermore, beavers can affect the development and physiology of amphibians, it has been reported that larvae of wood frog Rana sylvatica resounded rapidly to changes in their environment induced by beavers. The richness and abundance of reptiles in old beaver ponds were significantly higher compared with new beaver ponds and un-impounded streams.

Ponds create nursing ground for fish, increased fish habitat and habitat complexity, however there is concern of beaver's impact on migratory fish patterns. Sediment storage increases clear water, increases some fish species, while energy dissipation allows some fish species to thrive better and favors lentic (still-water) species. Deeper beaver ponds provide important overwintering habitat, reduce ice cover, and stabilizes temperature regimes. On the other hand, there have been numerous studies of beaver dams along rivers and their effect on migrating fish, such as Atlantic salmon species. While abandoned beaver sites allow salmon to swim upstream when water breaks through the dams, the reduced water energy can provide an easy way for salmon to swim upstream to old beaver ponds. Total blockage of small streams is reported to deter some salmon species from using beaver streams; however, there are reports of migration to bigger streams that are not influenced by beavers. Additionally, increased temperature regimes in ponds and streams can have adverse effects on salmon populations that are living in areas already at the top of their temperature regime, causing negative affects on the species habitat.

Beavers as flagship species 
When first consideration reintroducing beavers into certain ecosystems, successful trials have started by raising community awareness and support. Some ways that support and awareness was created was through different community outreach and educational resources. It is reported that those that did not have community support, did not have successful beaver reintroduction. As a flagship species, beavers raise awareness and resources for wide-scale riparian and woodland restoration programs by stimulating conservation awareness. Holding public forums and community events to show the community how beavers will help with their environment is important and can educate people about other environmental concerns, such as decreased Aspen forests or other riparian forest issues. Furthermore, they increase ecotourism. Many areas around Europe that have reintroduced beavers have reported increased tourism, whether it is tours specific to seeing beavers, or the animals that the beavers have attracted such as birds or bats.

Criticism 
Some worries that people have about the reintroduction of beavers is their impact on agricultural areas, in which it was reported that some beaver dams did affect flooding of farm lands, decreasing crop yields. In order to fix this, beaver experts suggest relocating beaver dams, using water sounds to trick beavers into building the dam at different places, or using pipes in dams to help control water levels. These finding were also suggested for instances when beavers created dams blocking man-made structures such as culverts. In one instance, poles were placed 10 feet in front of a culvert, changing the place of the water flow sound, in which the beavers build the dam at the poles, allowing for runoff to go through the culvert. Furthermore, some farmers have reported beavers burrowing in their fields, leading to damage to machinery such as tractor and damage to crops. Governments have addressed this issue by voluntarily compensating the farmers for these damages. Additionally, if the beavers are proving to be pests, there are management practices in place to relocate the beaver population to areas where they would be less disruptive. There are poorly founded concerns by some anglers, particularly in the United Kingdom, that beavers will compete with them for fish, as author C.S. Lewis depicted within The Lion, the Witch, and the Wardrobe. These concerns have no standing as beaver eat vegetation and wood, and do not consume fish.

References 

Conservation projects
beavers
Mammals of Europe